Events in the year 2023 in Nigeria.

Incumbents

Federal government 
 President: Muhammadu Buhari (APC)
 Vice President: Yemi Osinbajo (APC)
 Senate President: Ahmed Lawan (APC)
 House Speaker: Femi Gbajabiamila (APC)
 Chief Justice: Olukayode Ariwoola

Governors 

 Abia State: Okezie Ikpeazu (PDP)
 Adamawa State: Ahmadu Umaru Fintiri PDP
 Akwa Ibom State: Udom Gabriel Emmanuel PDP
 Anambra State: Charles Chukwuma Soludo (APGA) 
 Bauchi State: Bala Muhammed PDP
 Bayelsa State: Duoye Diri PDP
 Benue State: Samuel Ortom PDP
 Borno State: BabaGana Umara APC
 Cross River State: Benedict Ayade PDP
 Delta State: Ifeanyi Okowa PDP
 Ebonyi State: Dave Umahi PDP
 Edo State: Godwin Obaseki APC
 Ekiti State: Biodun Oyebanji (APC) 
 Enugu State: Ifeanyi Ugwuanyi PDP
 Gombe State: Muhammad Inuwa Yahaya APC
 Imo State: Hope Uzodinma APC
 Jigawa State: Badaru Abubakar APC
 Kaduna State: Nasir Ahmad el-Rufai APC
 Kano State: Abdullahi Umar Ganduje APC
 Katsina State: Aminu Bello Masari APC
 Kebbi State: Abubakar Atiku Bagudu APC
 Kogi State: Yahaya Bello APC
 Kwara State: AbdulRahman AbdulRasaq APC
 Lagos State: Babajide Sanwo-Olu APC
 Nasarawa State: Abdullahi Sule APC
 Niger State: Abubakar Sani Bello APC
 Ogun State: Dapo Abiodun APC
 Ondo State: Oluwarotimi Odunayo Akeredolu APC
 Osun State: Ademola Adeleke PDP
 Oyo State: Oluwaseyi Makinde PDP
 Plateau State: Simon Lalong APC
 Rivers State: Ezenwo Nyesom Wike PDP
 Sokoto State: Aminu Waziri Tambuwal PDP
 Taraba State: Arch. Darius Ishaku PDP
 Yobe State: Mai Mala Buni APC
 Zamfara State: Bello Matawalle PDP

Events 

 25 January – At least 27 herders are killed, and several others are injured, after a bomb explodes near Nasarawa. Some herders have claimed that the explosion resulted from an airstrike.
 29 January – At least nine people are killed when a container falls from a truck onto a commercial bus in Lagos.
 4 February-ongoing - 2023 Nigerian protests begin began due to the Nigerian Naira, and protests due to the election.
 25 February – 2023 Nigerian general election  Nigerians head to the polls to elect a new president and members of their National Assembly.
 3 March – Sixteen people are killed when a pipeline explodes in Emohua, Rivers State.
 9 March – Six people are killed and at least 25 others are injured after a train collides with a public bus in Lagos.
 11 March – Herder–farmer conflicts in Nigeria: Sixteen people are killed by Fula gunmen at a police checkpoint in Zangon Kataf, Kaduna State.
18 March – 2023 Nigerian Gubernatorial and state of assembly election was held.

Predicted and scheduled events

Culture

Deaths 

 9 January – Peace Anyiam-Osigwe, 53, filmmaker and entertainment executive.
 14 January – Femi Ogunrombi, actor and ethnomusicologist.
 19 January – Oladipo Ogunlesi, 99, professor of medicine.
 1 February – Dan Suleiman, 80, politician, governor of Plateau State (1976–1978).

See also 

 2023 in West Africa
 List of Nigerian films of 2023

References 

 
Nigeria
Nigeria
2020s in Nigeria
Years of the 21st century in Nigeria